Simon Moreau (fl. 1553–1558) was a composer of the Franco-Flemish School. He published compositions including settings of Vous Seulement and Sancta et immaculata, 1553.

References

Year of birth unknown
Year of death unknown
Renaissance composers
Male classical composers